A430 may refer to:

 A430 motorway (France)
 A430 road (England)
 A.430, a type of aircraft
 Canon PowerShot A430, a camera